United States of America Netball Association is the national body which oversees, promotes and manages Netball in the United States.   It was created in 1992 in New York City.

As of 3 March 2019, the USA was ranked #32 out of 38 countries on the world ranking.

References

Netball in the United States
United States
Sports governing bodies in the United States
1992 establishments in the United States
Sports organizations established in 1992
United